Bernard Yeung Kam John Yeung Sik Yuen GOSK (born 1 January 1947) is a former Chief Justice of the Supreme Court of Mauritius.

Career
After being called to the bar at Lincoln's Inn, London in 1970, Yeung Sik Yuen returned to his native Mauritius and took a position as State Counsel in the office of the Attorney-General of Mauritius, wherein he served until 1976. After that he moved to the bench, serving first as a magistrate and from 1984 to 1989 as Master & Registrar and Judge in Bankruptcy. He was named a judge of the Supreme Court in 1989, and elevated to Senior Puisne Judge in 1995. He was sworn in as Chief Justice on 13 June 2007, succeeding Ariranga Pillay after the latter's retirement and was replaced on 31 December 2013 by Kheshoe Parsad Matadeen. He has also served as the Mauritian independent expert on the UN Committee on the Elimination of Racial Discrimination.

Personal life
Yeung Sik Yuen was born in Curepipe into a family of Hakka Sino-Mauritian businesspeople; his ancestors started out as shopkeepers and grew their company into various fields. He did his secondary education at St. Joseph's College, Curepipe and then in 1966 went to the United Kingdom to study law at the University of Leeds, completing his degree in 1969. He has been the President of the Lions Club of Port-Louis in 1988 and 2000. He is married with three children. His nephew Michael was Mauritius' Minister of Tourism and Leisure.

References

1947 births
Living people
Alumni of the University of Leeds
20th-century Mauritian judges
Mauritian people of Chinese descent
People from Meixian District
Mauritian expatriates in the United Kingdom

Members of Lincoln's Inn
People from Plaines Wilhems District
Chief justices of Mauritius
African Commission on Human and Peoples' Rights members
21st-century Mauritian judges